Stefan Mitrović may refer to:
 Stefan Mitrović (water polo) (born 1988), Serbian water polo player
 Stefan Mitrović (footballer, born 1990), Serbian footballer
 Stefan Mitrović (footballer, born January 2002), Serbian footballer
 Stefan Mitrović (footballer, born August 2002), Serbian footballer